Rabbi Shmuel Yaniv is one of the pioneers of Bible code research. He has authored over twenty books in Hebrew.  He studied for two years under Rabbi Zvi Yehuda Hacohen Kook in the Merkaz Harav Yeshiva in Jerusalem. During the 1970s he taught in the Midrashiat Noam school. He taught for many years in Ulpanat Tzfira girls' school.

References

External links
  Official website

Israeli rabbis
Mercaz HaRav alumni
Living people
Year of birth missing (living people)